John T. Edge (born December 22, 1962) is a writer, commentator, and, since its founding in 1999, director of the Southern Foodways Alliance, an institute of the Center for the Study of Southern Culture at the University of Mississippi. He has written several books on Southern food. He contributes to the Oxford American and the New York Times, and has written for Garden & Gun and Afar. In 2017, he published The Potlikker Papers, a personal history of Southern food.

Education
John T. received his undergraduate degree from the University of Georgia. Edge holds a master's degree in Southern Studies from the University of Mississippi and an MFA in Creative Non-Fiction from Goucher College.

Southern Foodways Alliance
In 1999, Edge co-founded and became the director of the Southern Foodways Alliance, an institute of the Center for the Study of Southern Culture at the University of Mississippi. Every October, the Southern Foodways Alliance sponsors a symposium in Oxford, Mississippi, on American southern cuisine. Edge is one of the primary organizers and the master of ceremonies for the many events, which attract several hundred attendees. The SFA also engages in oral history work, makes films, and stages other events.

Media
Edge has authored numerous books detailing how America eats, including, Fried Chicken: An American Story, Apple Pie: An American Story, Southern Belly, and The Truck Food Cookbook. Edge has been a regular contributor for the weekend edition of NPR's All Things Considered and has appeared on various television shows including CBS Sunday Morning and Iron Chef.

In 2012, he won the MFK Fisher Distinguished Writing Award from the James Beard Foundation. His work has also been featured in 10 editions of the Best Food Writing Anthology. 

Hosts the SEC Network / ESPN television show TrueSouth.

Host of the SFA podcast "Gravy," along with Melissa Hall.

Personal life
Edge was born in the rural community of Clinton, in Jones County, Georgia. He lives in Oxford, Mississippi, with his wife, Blair Hobbs, a painter, writer, and teacher. They have one son, Jess.

Publications 
 Edge, John T. The Potlikker Papers: A Food History of the Modern South. Penguin Press, 2017. 
 Edge, John T. The Truck Food Cookbook: 150 Recipes and Ramblings from America's Best Restaurants on Wheels. Workman, 2012. 
 Edge, John T. and Roahen, Sara, editors. The Southern Foodways Alliance Community Cookbook. UGA Press, 2010. 
 Edge, John T. Southern Belly: The Ultimate Food Lovers Companion to the American South. 2012. .
 Edge, John T. Donuts: An American Passion. Putnam Adult, 2006. .
 Edge, John T. Hamburgers and Fries: An American Story. Thorndike Press, 2005. .
 Edge, John T. Fried Chicken: An American Story. Putnam Adult, 2004. .
 Edge, John T. Apple Pie: An American Story. Putnam Adult, 2004. .
 Edge, John T. and Hobbs, Blair. Southern Belly: The Ultimate Food Lover's Guide to the South. Hill Street Press, 2002. .
 Edge, John T. A Gracious Plenty. HP Trade, 2002.

See also 
 Austin Leslie

References

External links 
 Financial Times  Top Twenty Southerners to Watch

Living people
American food writers
People from Oxford, Mississippi
University of Mississippi faculty
1962 births